Fikret Alomerović (born 3 December 1970 in Skopje) is a former Macedonian football player.

Club career
Born in Skopje, SR Macedonia, back then still within Yugoslavia, Alomerović played with FK Skopje, FK Radnički Niš, FK Vardar, FK Sloga Jugomagnat, FC Torpedo-Luzhniki Moscow, HIT Gorica, Valur and Víkingur.

External links

1970 births
Living people
Footballers from Skopje
Association football defenders
Macedonian footballers
FK Skopje players
FK Radnički Niš players
FK Vardar players
FK Sloga Jugomagnat players
FC Torpedo Moscow players
ND Gorica players
Fikret Alomerović
Fikret Alomerović
Russian Premier League players
Slovenian PrvaLiga players
Fikret Alomerović
Macedonian expatriate footballers
Expatriate footballers in Serbia and Montenegro
Macedonian expatriate sportspeople in Serbia and Montenegro
Expatriate footballers in Russia
Macedonian expatriate sportspeople in Russia
Expatriate footballers in Slovenia
Macedonian expatriate sportspeople in Slovenia
Expatriate footballers in Iceland
Macedonian expatriate sportspeople in Iceland